Survive the Tribe is a television series which airs on the National Geographic Channel. In the program Hazen Audel visits several tribes around the world and participates in their daily lives. He learns about their survival tactics. Hazen Audel went on to make Primal Survivor also for National Geographic.

Production
The series is produced by Icon Films. It aired in the United States and the United Kingdom in July 2014, with other countries following later the same year.

Format
In Survive the Tribe Audel joins a tribe for a week and is trained in several of the survival skills the tribe has used to survive over the years. Audel is a trained biologist who works as a survival guide. In the show he adopts the customs, diet and way of life to live with and as the members of the tribe he visits.

Series overview

Episodes

Season 1 (2014)

Season 2 (2016)

References

External links
 
 Official website

National Geographic (American TV channel) original programming

2014 American television series debuts